This is a list of members of the Victorian Legislative Assembly as elected at the 15 March 1907 election and subsequent by-elections up to the election of 29 December 1908.

Note the "Term in Office" refers to that members term(s) in the Assembly, not necessarily for that electorate.

Thomas Bent was Premier, Treasurer and Minister for Railways. 
Frank Madden was Speaker, Albert Craven was Chairman of Committees.

 Bennett died 8 September 1908; replaced by Ted Cotter in October 1908.
 Bromley died 29 September 1908; replaced by Robert Solly in October 1908.

References

 Re-member (a database of all Victorian MPs since 1851). Parliament of Victoria.

Members of the Parliament of Victoria by term
20th-century Australian politicians